Khanapur Assembly constituency may refer to

 Khanapur, Karnataka Assembly constituency
 Khanapur, Maharashtra Assembly constituency
 Khanapur, Telangana Assembly constituency